The 1992 Big East men's basketball tournament took place at Madison Square Garden in New York City, from March 12 to March 15, 1992. Its winner received the Big East Conference's automatic bid to the 1992 NCAA tournament. It is a single-elimination tournament with four rounds.  With the addition of Miami to the conference, 1992 was the first time the tournament included ten teams.  Seton Hall, Georgetown and St. John's all finished with the best regular season conference record.  Through tiebreakers, Seton Hall was awarded the #1 seed.

Syracuse defeated Georgetown in the championship game 56–54, to claim its third Big East tournament championship.

Bracket

Awards
Dave Gavitt Trophy (Most Valuable Player): Alonzo Mourning, Georgetown

All Tournament Team
 Terry Dehere, Seton Hall
 Dave Johnson, Syracuse
 Lawrence Moten, Syracuse
 Alonzo Mourning, Georgetown
 Malik Sealy, St. John's
 Jerome Scott, Miami

References

External links
 

Tournament
Big East men's basketball tournament
Basketball in New York City
College sports in New York City
Sports competitions in New York City
Sports in Manhattan
Big East men's basketball tournament
Big East men's basketball tournament
1990s in Manhattan
Madison Square Garden